The Theban Tomb TT63 is located in Sheikh Abd el-Qurna. It forms part of the Theban Necropolis, situated on the west bank of the Nile opposite to Luxor.

The tomb belongs to an 18th Dynasty ancient Egyptian named Sobekhotep, who was treasurer and the mayor of the Southern Lake and the Land of Sobek (Faiyum) during the reign of Thutmosis IV.

Sobekhotep was the son of an Overseer of the Seal named Min. Sobekhotep's wife Meryt was the Nurse of the King's daughter Tiaa and the Chief of the Harem of Sobek of Shedty.

See also
 List of Theban tombs

References

Buildings and structures completed in the 13th century BC
Theban tombs